A Girl's Guide to 21st Century Sex is a documentary TV series about sex, which ran in eight episodes on Channel 5 and was presented by Dr. Catherine Hood. The 45-minute-long episodes (including advertisements) were broadcast on Monday nights. The series started on 30 October 2006, with the final programme broadcast on 18 December 2006.

Each episode explained a sex position and covered a sexually transmitted disease. Additionally, the following topics were discussed: sex among people with disabilities and overweight people, penis enlargement devices, penis enlargement surgery, sexual violence against men and penis removal, tantric sex, the g-spot, erectile dysfunction, sex reassignment surgery, cosmetic surgery of the vagina (labiaplasty), swinging, lichen sclerosus, the use of recreational drugs during sex, male homosexual sex in public toilets, full body plastic wrap bondage, and sex dolls.

The programme included close shots of the male and female body as well as footage of sexual intercourse and ejaculation filmed with an internal camera placed inside the vagina. These scenes were filmed starring English-born pornographic actor Stefan Hard and Australian-born pornographic actress Elizabeth Lawrence.

Episodes

Ofcom complaints
21 people complained to the national television regulator, Ofcom, that the explicitness of the sexual scenes breached obscenity and broadcasting regulations, and that the series imparted "inappropriate information to vulnerable young girls". Ofcom ruled that there was no rule banning the showing of genuine sexual acts on free-to-air television, and that "in [their] view the portrayal of sex in this programme genuinely sought to inform and educate on sex", concluding that "whilst the visuals were explicit at times, nothing was transmitted in a manner that could be construed as having the potential to harm people under the age of 18", particularly given its context as a serious factual programme, and as such, it was ruled that the episodes were not in breach of any broadcasting regulations.

References

External links

2000s British documentary television series
2006 British television series debuts
2006 British television series endings
British television documentaries
Channel 5 (British TV channel) original programming
Sex education television series
Obscenity controversies in television
Television series by Endemol
Sex education in the United Kingdom
Television controversies in the United Kingdom